The Orlando Ballet is an American professional ballet company based in Orlando, Florida. Their main performance space is the Dr. Phillips Center for the Performing Arts. The company was founded in 1974 as the Performing Arts Company of Florida. They changed their name in 1978 to the Southern Ballet Theatre, and began performances at the Bob Carr Theatre.

History 

Since 2009, the company has been led by Artistic Director Robert Hill.

The company performs the Nutcracker annually.

The ballet currently employs 23 full time dancers and 4 apprentice dancers. In 2019, Orlando Ballet decided to stop charging dancers to audition.

Orlando Ballet School 
Orlando Ballet is also known for their training program, the Orlando Ballet School. They are an affiliate of the American Ballet Theatre.

Controversy 
Orlando Ballet had a highly publicized contract dispute with the Dr. Phillips Center for the Performing Arts, along with Orlando Philharmonic and Opera Orlando regarding the performing arts center's new Steinmetz Hall. A deal was eventually reached.

References

External links 
 Official Website.

Ballet companies in the United States
Performing groups established in 1974